KSUE (1240 AM) is a radio station broadcasting a News Talk Information format. Licensed to Susanville, California, United States, it serves the Sierra Nevada area.

The station is currently owned by Sierra Broadcasting Corporation and features programming from Premiere Radio Networks, ABC Radio and Westwood One.

History
In July 1948, the station's call letters changed from the original KSUH to KSUE. The new designation honored Susan Roop, for whom Susanville was named. She was the daughter of the town's founder.

References

External links

Official Website

SUE
News and talk radio stations in the United States